Misano Adriatico is a comune (municipality) in the Province of Rimini in the Italian region Emilia-Romagna, located about  southeast of Bologna and about  southeast of Rimini.

Misano Adriatico borders the following municipalities: Cattolica, Coriano, Riccione, San Clemente, San Giovanni in Marignano.

Misano is a seaside town with a few resorts. The main attraction of the town is the Misano World Circuit Marco Simoncelli. The Conca enters the Adriatic Sea near the town.

References

External links
 Official website
 Misano Adriatico

Cities and towns in Emilia-Romagna